Gibbs High School may refer to:

Gibbs High School, Kumta, India
Gibbs High School (St. Petersburg, Florida), in the Pinellas County school district
Gibbs High School (Corryton, Tennessee), in the Knox County school district